Lydia Goldblatt (born 1978) is a British photographer, living in London.

Life and work
Goldblatt was born and lives in London. She gained a masters in photography from London College of Communication.

Her book Still Here (2013) contains photographs of her parents and of their home, in Hampstead, London.

Publications
Still Here. Berlin: Hatje Cantz, 2013. With essays by Christiane Monarchi and Goldblatt. .

Awards
2020: Second prize, Taylor Wessing Photographic Portrait Prize

Collections
Goldblatt's work is held in the following permanent collection:
National Portrait Gallery, London: 1 print (as of 29 January 2023)

References

External links

21st-century British photographers
Alumni of the University of the Arts London
English women photographers
Photographers from London
Living people
1978 births
21st-century women photographers
21st-century British women artists